The 2012 Queensland Firebirds season saw Queensland Firebirds compete in the 2012 ANZ Championship. As both defending champions and winners of the Tauranga Pre-Season Tournament, Firebirds began the season as favorites. However they subsequently won just seven games and finished sixth during the regular season, failing to qualify for the play-offs. 
In October 2012, after three seasons as Firebirds' captain, Lauren Nourse announced her retirement.

Players

Player movements

2012 roster

Notes
  Nicola Gray made her ANZ Championship and Firebirds debut, as a temporary replacement player for Chelsea Pitman, in the Round 5 match against Melbourne Vixens.
  Stephanie Wood was called up as a temporary replacement player.  However she never made a senior appearance for Firebirds.

Tauranga Pre-Season Tournament
On 2, 3 and 4 March, Waikato Bay of Plenty Magic hosted a pre-season tournament at the TECT Arena in Tauranga. For the first time since 2008, all ten ANZ Championship teams competed at the same tournament. The ten teams were divided into two pools of five. Teams within each pool played each other once and the winners qualified for the final. Queensland Firebirds won both their pool and the tournament overall after defeating Melbourne Vixens 50–30 in the final.

Final

Regular season

Fixtures and results
Round 1

Round 2

Round 3

Round 4

Round 5

Round 6

Round 7

Round 8

Round 9

Round 10

Round 11

Round 12
Queensland Firebirds received a bye.
Round 13

Round 14

Final table

References

Queensland Firebirds seasons
Queensland Firebirds